Brigitte Schuchardt (born 28 March 1955, in Jena) is a retired German swimmer who won a bronze medal in the 100 m breaststroke at the 1973 World Aquatics Championships, as well as gold and silver medals in medley events at the 1970 European Aquatics Championships. She also participated in the 1972 Summer Olympics in three individual events but did not reach the finals.

References

1955 births
Living people
Sportspeople from Jena
People from Bezirk Gera
East German female swimmers
German female swimmers
Olympic swimmers of East Germany
Swimmers at the 1972 Summer Olympics
World Aquatics Championships medalists in swimming
European Aquatics Championships medalists in swimming